Miller is an unincorporated community and census-designated place (CDP) in Lawrence County, Ohio, United States, along the Ohio River. It was first listed as a CDP prior to the 2020 census.

The CDP is in southeastern Lawrence County, in Rome Township. It sits on the west bank of the Ohio River and is bordered to the south by the village of Athalia. Ohio State Route 7 (Market Street) passes through the center of the community, leading north (upriver)  to Gallipolis and southwest (downriver)  to Chesapeake, across from Huntington, West Virginia. State Route 217 leads west from Miller  to Scottown.

Demographics

References 

Census-designated places in Lawrence County, Ohio
Census-designated places in Ohio